The Clay County Courthouse is a historic courthouse building in Ashland, Alabama.  The Classical Revival-style building has served as the county courthouse since its completion in 1906.  Notable characteristics include its large dome, with clocks inset on four sides, and cupola surmounted by a statuary representing justice.  It was added to the National Register of Historic Places on November 21, 1976.

References

National Register of Historic Places in Clay County, Alabama
Government buildings completed in 1906
County courthouses in Alabama
Courthouses on the National Register of Historic Places in Alabama
Neoclassical architecture in Alabama
1906 establishments in Alabama